Tweenies is a British live action puppet children's television series created by Will Brenton and Iain Lauchlan. The programme is focused on four pre-school aged characters, known as the "Tweenies", playing, singing, dancing, and learning in a fictional playgroup in England. They are cared for by two adult Tweenies and two dogs.

390 episodes were broadcast between 6 September 1999 and 25 July 2002. In 2000, the show won a BAFTA award for Best Pre-school Live Action series, and singles featuring exclusive songs spent some weeks in the charts during the early 2000s. The series premiered on the BBC's children's block, and aired reruns on CBeebies from the channel's launch in 2002 until 2016. In the United States, it was shown on Noggin, a sister channel to Nickelodeon. It also aired on Nickelodeon's Nick Jr. block from 18 July to 25 September 2003.

Overview and history
The idea for the programme came from Will Brenton and Iain Lauchlan, a pair with a track record of being involved in BBC children's programming. Together they set up Tell-Tale Productions at Elstree Film Studios in Hertfordshire. Iain Lauchlan was a presenter on Play School, Fingermouse, and Playdays, meeting Brenton, a director, writer and also a presenter, during the latter. Together they started producing two of the Playdays strands before forming their own production companies Tell-Tale Productions and, more recently, Wish Films. They also created The Fun Song Factory, Boo!, BB3B, and Jim Jam and Sunny.

Tweenies is a production of Tell-Tale Productions in association with the BBC. Animation for the show was produced by A Productions, an animation studio based in Bristol, England, with Ealing Animation providing some animation in a few early episodes. Computer animation for the series was provided by Clockwork Digital, with Ben Mars animating Mungo, the computer creature who appears in some later episodes.

Episodes consist of a mixture of story, song, and creative activity. Music plays an important part in the programme and children are encouraged to join in with songs and actions.

The programme is set in a nursery in England attended by the four Tweenies themselves: Jake, Fizz, Milo and Bella. They are in the care of two adults, Max and Judy, and two dogs, Doodles and Izzles.

The show includes a "Tweenie Clock", with five circular lights arranged in a pentagonal shape with the lights denoting "News Time" (Circle Time in the US) – Orange, "Messy Time" – Blue, "Song Time" – Yellow, "Telly Time" (Video Time in the US) – Green and "Story Time" – Red. "Surprise Time" is a special time determined when all five lights glow. A button at the centre of the clock (Purple) is pressed to select the activity that will be undertaken next.

It was formerly shown on CBeebies, from 11 February 2002 until 1 April 2016. Like a number of other CBeebies programmes, a live stage version of the show has toured in the UK. The most recent tour, Top of the Tots, toured the British Isles during 2009, the series' 10th anniversary. In addition, the tour also played several shows in Hong Kong in late September and early October 2009. The Tweenies were also regulars on the annual CBeebies Live tours around the British Isles. Between 2003 and 2005, there was also a Tweenies theme park,  at Alton Towers in the Cred Street section aimed at younger children, which replaced the Barney section and then was removed in favour of Bob the Builder. In 2000, Tweenies won two awards: Best Pre-School Educational Program and Best Live Action Pre-School Programme.

The original prototypes for the Tweenies characters were designed by Sally Preisig of Mimics Productions; they were later re-scaled into two sizes for the characters shown on the series. In addition, Preisig also designed the character costumes and was co-constructor/developer for the Tweenies' full-size puppets. The costume fabric comes from the UK and was imported and dyed into their present colours; it is about the same thickness as fleece jumpers.

Neal Scanlan Studios made the Animatronic Tweenie heads.

Characters

Main
 Bella (operated by Tamsin Heatley and Esther Collins; voiced by Sally Preisig 1999–2000, Emma Weaver 2000–2002 in the UK, Alyson Court in the US) is a five-year-old blue-skinned girl with blonde hair, usually accompanied with a red hair bow. As the oldest and tallest of the Tweenies, she is sometimes bossy (although she tries to deny this) and likes her own way. Sometimes she causes things to go wrong with her overconfidence - for instance, in the episode 'It Wasn't Me', Bella accidentally breaks one of the strings from Max's marionette puppet despite everyone having been told not to play with it as it was "special", and she hides it in Doodles' bed and tries to blame him. Despite this, she always apologises for her wrongdoings eventually. Although Bella comes across as bossy she is very helpful and caring to the younger Tweenies, in particular, Jake; who she tends to look after whenever he is upset or in need. She loves acting, painting and reading. Her favourite colour is red. Her best friend is Fizz.
 Milo (operated by C.H. Beck 1999–2000, Matthew Lyons/Kate Ryan 2000–2002; voiced by Bob Golding in the UK, Tracey Moore in the US) is a four-year-old purple-skinned boy with black hair. He is energetic, hyperactive, and cheerful. Sometimes he can be a little impulsive but is ultimately friendly and good-hearted, never means any harm, and always apologises in the end when he upsets someone. He often adds the suffix "-a-rooney" to words. He loves football and magic. His favourite colour is blue. His best friend is Jake.
 Fizz (operated by Jenny Hutchinson 1999–2000, Angela Reynolds 2000, Francesca Anderson 2001–2002; voiced by Colleen Daley in the UK, Lisa Yamanaka in the US) is a four-year-old yellow-skinned girl with reddish brown beaded hair. She is sweet and sometimes shy but can get whiny and stroppy for the smallest reasons. Even though they sometimes don't get along, Fizz is very close to Milo and sometimes kisses him when he's kind to her (though she still considers Bella her best friend rather than Milo). She loves ballet, dressing up and playing with dolls. Her favourite colour is pink.
 Jake (operated by Samantha Dodd 1999–2002 voiced by Justin Fletcher in the UK, Colin O'Meara in the US) is a three-year-old orange-skinned boy with a blonde Mohican. Being the youngest Tweenie, he sometimes feels left out and excluded from the other Tweenies' games when he is not big enough to join in. He is sweet and has a close bond with Doodles, but he sometimes shows signs of being homesick and is prone to temper tantrums when frustrated. He will often turn to Bella or Doodles for support or advice when unhappy. He sometimes gets words mixed up. He loves playing pretend (especially as a superhero) and catch. His favourite colour is green. His best friend is Milo.

Supporting
 Doodles (operated by Alan Riley and John Tobias; voiced by Justin Fletcher in the UK, James Rankin in the US) is a red and yellow male dog. Doodles is a very friendly and calm dog. His favourite colour is yellow. His voice is based on Scooby-Doo's voice. He loves going for walks with Max and can often be seen looking out for Jake.
 Izzles (operated by Fiona Watkins; voiced by Colleen Daley) is a purple and white female dog, who was first introduced in 2001. Unlike Doodles, she is a puppy and therefore much younger and very energetic. Her favourite colour is purple. At first, her antics were not to the Tweenies liking, more so Jake but she has since calmed down and settled in. The girls often like to dress her up in fancy stuff. She is also a companion for Doodles. She was originally going to be called Squiggles until it was realised that someone already had the rights to that name and that small children find it hard to say 'SQU'.
 Max (operated by Simon Grover/Matthew Lyons (some episodes); voiced by Bob Golding in the UK, James Rankin in the US) is a pink-skinned, middle-aged man who is one of the two managers of the playgroup of the Tweenies. He speaks with a Yorkshire accent. He loves animals, trains and exploring the outside world.
 Judy (operated by Simon Grover/Sinead Rushe (outside); voiced by Sinead Rushe in the UK, Caroly Larson in the US) is a green-skinned woman who is the other of the playgroup managers. She speaks with a Northern Irish accent. She loves reading, gardening and being creative.

Episodes

The Tweenies aired its first episode Tweenie Band on 6 September 1999 on its original programme block CBBC and last aired on 25 July 2002 with What Makes Summer? on its former channel CBeebies. In total, there are 390 episodes. There have been special episodes, such as a series of Be Safe with the Tweenies and expanded forty minute episodes.

Episode 252, Favourite Songs (first aired in March 2001) was withdrawn from further airing in January 2013, after the BBC received 216 complaints about a scene within the episode, themed as a parody of an episode of Top of the Pops where Max appears dressed as disgraced host Jimmy Savile. The episode aired three months after claims of sexual abuse committed by Savile came to light. The BBC removed Tweenies from the CBeebies schedule altogether for four months. The episodes then came back to the schedule from June 2013 until April 2016.

Telecast
In the USA, it was shown on Noggin, a sister channel to Nickelodeon. It also aired on Nickelodeon's Nick Jr. block from 18 July to 25 September 2003.

Discography

Albums

Singles

Live shows
The Tweenies have had success in live performances.

Top of the Pops
In November 2000, the Tweenies appeared on a few episodes of the show, performing their single No. 1.

In December 2000, the Tweenies starred in their own dedicated special of the series which featured more of their singles like Do The Lollipop and Have Fun Go Mad!. This episode was later released on VHS and DVD as Music is Pop-a-Rooney! in July 2002, with new wrap-around segments recorded in the Playgroup.

Arena Tours
Beginning in 2001, the first Tweenies Live! show went on tour around arenas around the United Kingdom, produced by Tell-Tale Productions and BBC Worldwide, the show featured the Tweenies singing their favourite songs. A live-recording of this tour from the London Arena was released on VHS in July 2001. A follow-up show - Tweenies Live! 2: The Fab-a-Rooney Tour, toured from February–July 2002, and featured the live debut of Izzles.

In December 2001, a follow-up show titled Tweenies Live! The Christmas Present was presented at the Royal Albert Hall for the Christmas period, and was later given a wide arena tour in December 2003-January 2004, where Izzles joined the cast. A recording of the 2001 version was released on VHS in November 2002 and was later released on DVD in November 2006 as part of the Tweenies: The Ultimate Christmas Collection DVD compilation.

The fourth tour - No Sleep 'til Bedtime, toured the UK from March–May 2005. This tour was notable for featuring covers of licensed tracks sung by the Tweenies.

The fifth tour - The Enchanted Toyshop toured the UK in the Spring and Summer of 2007. It was the first Tweenies live tour to be solely produced by BBC Worldwide and the first to be shown in theatres instead of arenas.

The most recent tour - Top of the Tots, toured the UK in Early 2009 to celebrate the programme's 10th anniversary.

Merchandise

DVDs and videos
These were released by BBC Worldwide and some various DVDs are still available in retailers.

 Ready to Play with the Tweenies

Many of the above videos have also been dubbed into other languages. In addition, several of the Tweenies videos were produced in special versions for retailers with additional footage (for example, the "Party Games, Laughs & Giggles" video distributed at Marks & Spencer stores carried two additional segments, adding ten minutes to the video's running time). Many of the above videos were also released as DVDs under different names. iTunes has released a Best of Tweenies volume 1 which consists of the first six episodes of the series.

Books
From 1999 until 2006, various books were released from Tweenies, based on the episodes that were mostly aired. There were also annuals that were released from 2001 to 2006 and other books, based on each character from Tweenies.

Toys and games
From the late 1990s into the early 2000s, the Tweenies were one of the most popular set of children's TV characters at the time, which led to a wide range merchandise being sold. Many toys were sold in various retailers, such as Toys "R" Us, Argos, & Woolworths. Merchandise included soft toys, playsets, collectible figures, board games, jigsaws and puzzles, talking toys, the video games which were Tweenies: Doodles' Bones for Game Boy Color and Tweenies: Game Time for PlayStation, and many other products.

Game Time

Tweenies: Game Time is an educational kids video game released in Europe on 30 March 2001 for PlayStation, published by BBC Multimedia. It takes the form of a minigame collection. The player controls Milo, Jake, Fizz and Bella through a series of 4 scenarios inspired by the show, one for each character.

The game was developed by Intelligent Games. The direction of the game was partially based on research by BBC Worldwide of children who watched the Television show, which found that "singing and dancing are major factors in the success of the show". according to a BBC article from before the game launched.

Awards and nominations

See also
 Fimbles
 Fun Song Factory
 In the Night Garden...
 Playdays
 Teletubbies
 Wimzie's House
 Yo Gabba Gabba!

References

External links

 
 

1990s British children's television series
2000s British children's television series
1999 British television series debuts
2002 British television series endings
1990s preschool education television series
2000s preschool education television series
British children's comedy television series
British children's musical television series
British preschool education television series
British television shows featuring puppetry
British television series with live action and animation
Television shows adapted into video games
Jimmy Savile
BAFTA winners (television series)
English-language television shows
BBC children's television shows
CBeebies
Nick Jr. original programming
Noggin (brand) original programming
Australian Broadcasting Corporation original programming
E.tv original programming
TVNZ 2 original programming
Television series about children
Fictional quartets
Television shows about dogs
Works about friendship
Television shows set in England
Television shows shot at Elstree Film Studios
Television series by BBC Studios
British children's musical groups